Zane Murray Coleman (born 24 December 1960) is a New Zealand wrestler. He competed in the men's freestyle 74 kg at the 1984 Summer Olympics.

References

1960 births
Living people
New Zealand male sport wrestlers
Olympic wrestlers of New Zealand
Wrestlers at the 1984 Summer Olympics
Place of birth missing (living people)